is a former Japanese football player.

Playing career
Nakajima was born in Sakai on August 20, 1977. After graduating from high school, he joined Japan Football League club Brummel Sendai (later Vegalta Sendai) in 1996. He played many matches as defensive midfielder from 1997 and the club was promoted to J2 League from 1999. However his opportunity to play decreased and he could not play at all in the match from 2001. Although the club was promoted to J1 League from 2002, he could not play at all in the match and he was released from the club end of 2002 season. In 2003, he moved to J1 club JEF United Ichihara (later JEF United Chiba). He was appreciated by manager Ivica Osim and also played many matches as center back not only defensive midfielder. The club also won the champions 2005 and 2006 J.League Cup. Although he played many matches after Osim left the club in 2006, he could hardly play in the match since Alex Miller became new manager in May 2008. In 2009, he moved to Sanfrecce Hiroshima. He became a regular player as defensive midfielder and center back. The club also won the 2nd place 2010 J.League Cup. From 2012, although he could not play many matches, the club won the champions 2012 and 2013 J1 League. He retired end of 2013 season.

Club statistics

References

External links

1977 births
Living people
Association football people from Osaka Prefecture
People from Sakai, Osaka
Japanese footballers
J1 League players
J2 League players
Japan Football League (1992–1998) players
Vegalta Sendai players
JEF United Chiba players
Sanfrecce Hiroshima players
Association football midfielders